The 1987 Wake Forest Demon Deacons football team was an American football team that represented Wake Forest University during the 1987 NCAA Division I-A football season. In its first season under head coach Bill Dooley, the team compiled a 7–4 record and finished in a tie for third place in the Atlantic Coast Conference.

Schedule

Roster

Team leaders

References

Wake Forest
Wake Forest Demon Deacons football seasons
Wake Forest Demon Deacons football